Matteo Fiorini (born 10 February 1978) is a Sammarinese politician who was a Captain Regent (head of government for San Marino) for the October 2011 to April 2012 political term. The post was shared with Gabriele Gatti. He also served with Enrico Carattoni as Captain Regent from October 2017 until April 2018.

References

1978 births
People from the City of San Marino
Captains Regent of San Marino
Members of the Grand and General Council
Living people